On July 4, 1816, Representative Thomas Gholson, Jr. (DR) of  died in office.  A special election was held to fill the resulting vacancy on October 10, 21–23, and 28, 1816 (each of the three districts within the 18th district held their election on a different day).

Election results

Nelson took his seat on December 4, 1816, at the start of the 2nd session of the 14th Congress.

See also
List of special elections to the United States House of Representatives

References

Special elections to the 14th United States Congress
1816
Virginia 1816 18
1816 Virginia elections
Virginia 18
United States House of Representatives 1816 18